The Royal Thomian Regatta is the annual rowing encounter between traditional school rivals Royal College, Colombo  and S. Thomas' College, Mt Lavinia. Begun in 1962 as the Royal Thomian Boat Race it later evolved into a regatta in 1966 and now consists of eight events. It is among the oldest and most prestigious Royal-Thomian sporting encounters.

The races are rowed over a distance of 1000 yards and take place on the Beira Lake in Colombo. The regatta takes place in the month of October and is usually held on the last Saturday of the month at the Colombo Rowing Club. The Royal Thomian Regatta is the oldest inter-school rowing regatta in Sri Lanka, with Royal being the first school to take up school rowing in the country and S.Thomas' following suit a few years later.

The Boat Race is still regarded as the most prestigious race of the regatta and is rowed for the Royal Thomian Boat Race Trophy (also known in the rowing fraternity as the 'Crossed Oars'). 
The overall winner of the Regatta is awarded the T. Noel Fernando Memorial Trophy.

Having begun in 1962 'The Regatta' is the 3rd oldest sporting encounter between Royal College and S. Thomas' College, after the Battle of the Blues Cricket Encounter and the Rugby Encounter.

History

Royal College first began rowing in 1953 and was the first school in Ceylon to do so, the first Captain was Alavi Mohomed. S. Thomas' College began rowing a few years later. In the following years the idea of a race between the two schools was agreed upon and in 1962 the first Boat Race was held on the Beira Lake at the Colombo Rowing Club. The Royalist's led by L.A.W. Sirisena beat the Thomians led by C.N. Sirimanne by 1 boat length and were the first holders of the Boat Race Trophy. S. Thomas' won their first Boat Race in 1964 beating Royal by 3 lengths. S.Thomas' continued to win the Boat Race trophy for three years after creating the largest series of successive wins that was not beaten until Royal College won five boat races between 2015-2019.

In 1966, the first Royal Thomian Regatta was held with a line-up of 6 events namely the Coxed Fours, Coxed Pairs (rowed coxless in the present day), and Single Sculls in two senior and junior categories.

Between 1973 and 1979 the regatta was not held due to a dispute between the two schools. The series was revived in 1980 has continued to the present except in 2006 when the regatta was not held.

In 2007 the Royal College led by Maalik Aziz created history by winning all races and winning the Overall Trophy with a margin of 40 points to nil. Royal College created new record timings for most events including lowering the Boat Race Trophy record by 8 secs to 3 mins 11 secs.

In 2008, history was written yet again with S.Thomas' returning the favour in kind in a hard fought regatta of 32-8 resulting in every record being broken. S'Thomas' College led by Manil Salgadoe and Devaan Hallock made most of the records including the Boat race (3.06). Royal College managed to scrape in two records to stay in the count in the Junior Coxed Four (rowed for eight points ) and the exhibition Junior 'B' Four race (carries no points).

In 2011, the Royal College Rowing Team led by skipper Chirath Karunanayake added a few more  records into the books. Among the records set were;
a) The biggest winning margin Royal 48-04 (2011) (subsequently broken in 2016 by Royal College) b) A new overall course record and the first ever sub-three minute race, for the Senior Four - 2:55 (Crew consisting of Chirath Karunanayake (B), Ajmal Sideek (2), Jehan Smarasekera (3), Sanjiva Jayasuriya (S) and coxed by Pasan Ranaweera)
c) Junior Four - 3:03
d) Senior Pair - 3:12
e) Senior Sculls - 3:28
f) Junior Sculls - 3:29. S.Thomas' only managed to win the B double and the Junior 'B' four, the latter event carries no points.

In 2015, for the first time in the Royal Thomian history, both crews managed to clock below 3 minutes at the boat race. The crew timings were as follows: Royal College 2:56 (Praveen Hapugalle, Prathap Perera, Amrith Fernando, Sajid Ajmal (S), Kaveen Rajapakse) and S.Thomas' 2:57 (Senal Senevirathne, Suramba Serasinghe, Ramith Nanayakkara, Saliya Gunasekera (S), Wishmitha Peiris).

In 2016, the highest number of trophies won in a regatta was achieved by Royal College led by Kaveen Rajapakse with a new tally of 50-02. S.Thomas' only secured the Junior Scull race worth two points that year. Currently this is the highest margin of victory in the Royal Thomian Regatta history.

In 2019, The Royal Thomian Regatta celebrated its Golden Jubilee event and was attended by a host of past captains and many well wishers. Royal College Rowing Crew captained by Sajaad Ajmal was able to retain both T.N. Fernando Memorial Trophy and Boat Race trophies for the 5th year in a row which was the first time either institutions achieved this feat. In another first, the Most Outstanding Oarsman trophy was shared by four oarsmen Sajaad Ajmal, Jehan Hapugalle, Mayukha Gamage & Maliq Hassen each contributing in events worth 20 points in favour of Royal College.

The regatta was not held in 2020 and 2021 owing to the COVID-19 pandemic.

In 2022, after a lapse of five defeats STC headed by skipper Arritha Raddalagoda defeated RC by 40 to 12 points. STC won all races except the Senior Scull, Junior Double Scull and Junior B Four. The boat race was won by circa 4 lengths on RC.

Race Format
All Races are rowed over the distance of 1000 yards on the Beira Lake course.

Each event has specific number of points allotted towards it the aggregate points is equal 40 points (up to 2008), the winner of the each event/race receives these points and at the end of the regatta the school with the highest aggregate of points will be declared the Overall Winner and be the holders of the T. Noel Fernando Trophy.

In 1999, The Junior 'B' Coxed Fours was introduced but the event carries no points.

In 2008, Senior and Junior Double Sculls were introduced as exhibition events. In 2009 Senior and Junior Double Sculls were awarded 8 and 4 points respectively, with the inclusion of the two doubles sculls the overall points tally was made to carry 52 points. In 2010 an Under 16 Fours event was added on the programme as an exhibition race.

Records

Boat Race

Most Outstanding Oarsman of the Regatta
The Oarsman with highest individual aggregate of points at the end of the regatta is awarded the
Most Outstanding Oarsman of the Regatta Trophy.

Previous Winners
 2001 Talal Shums (RC) -14 points (A4+, B1x)
 2002 Tharindu Gunesekara (STC) -20 Points (A4+, A2+)
 2003 Isuru Perera (STC) -18 Points (A4+, A1x)
 2004 Isuru Perera (STC) -18 Points (A4+, A1x)
 2005 Maalik Aziz (RC) -16 Points (B4+, A2-)
 2007 Maalik Aziz (RC)(A4+,B2-,A1x) / Dinouk J. Perera (RC) -22 Points (A4+, A2-, B1x)
 2008 Devaan Hallock (STC) -22 Points (A4+,A2-,B1x)
 2009 Sajeev De Silva (STC) -30 Points (A4+, B2-, A2x, A1x)
 2010 Sajeev De Silva (STC) -18 Points (A4+, A1x)
 2011 Chirath Karunanayake (RC) -26 Points (A4+, A2x, A1x)
 2012 Ming-Hua Chang/Ramith Nanayakkara (STC)- 20 points (A4+, A2x)
 2013 Sandesh Bartlett (STC) - 26 points (A1x, A2x, A4+)
 2014 Ramith Nanayakkara/Vishan Gunatilleka (STC) 20 points (A4+, A2-)
 2015 Sajid Ajmal/Praveen Hapugalla (RC) - 20 points (A4+, A2-)
 2016 Hashen Hettigoda (RC) - 26 points (A4+, A2×, A1x)
 2017 Hashen Hettigoda (RC) - 26 points (A4+, A2×, A1x)
 2018 Sajaad Ajmal/Abdulla Hassen (RC) - 20 points (A4+, A2-)
 2019 Sajaad Ajmal/Mayukha Gamage (RC)(A4+, A2-)/Jehan Hapugalle/Maliq Hassen (RC)(A4+, A2×) - 20 points
 2019-2021 The event was not not due to the Covid-19 pandemic.
 2022 Arittha Raddalgoda(STC)(A4+, A2x,B1x)-22 points

Statistics

Record Times

* denotes series record

Won 3 or more Boat Races
S. Thomas' 
 C H L Sirimanne 1965,1966,1967
 Isuru Perera 2002,2003,2004
 Dejan De Zoysa 2002,2003,2004
 Dineshka Aluwihare 2003,2004,2005
 Anuradha Nadaraja 2012,2013,2014
 Ramith Nanayakkara 2012,2013,2014
 Kemil Peter (cox) 2012,2013,2014

Royal
 E R Perera 1968,1969,1970
 Percy Fernando 1969,1970,1972
 Nalin Samarawickrama 1985,1987,1988
 Prathap Perera 2015,2016,2017
 M Sajaad Ajmal 2017,2018,2019

Trivia
 The Boat Race Trophy once possessed a metal wreath around the oars that has since been lost.
 Thomians Isuru Perera (2004), Dejan De Zoysa (2004), Sajeev De Silva (2010) have been awarded the 'Thomian Blue' for their outstanding contribution to Sri Lankan rowing, by representing the country and being placed at an international regatta while still in school.
 Olympic medallist, Mahe Drysdale briefly visited the regatta in 2012.

See also
 Royal College, Colombo
 S. Thomas' College, Mt Lavinia
 Royal-Thomian rivalry
 The Royal-Thomian
 Royal College Rowing Club

Notes and references

External links
 Royal College Rowing Club

Royal College, Colombo
Rowing competitions in Sri Lanka
Scholastic rowing